Sid Hemphill (1876 – 1963) was an American blues multi-instrumentalist and bandleader who played in his own string band mainly in Mississippi. He recorded for Alan Lomax in 1942 and again in 1959.

Born in Panola County, Mississippi, Hemphill was the son of a slave fiddle player, crafted instruments, and was a blind musician. Trained as a multi-instrumentalist, he could effectively play fiddle, banjo, guitar, jaw harp, piano, organ, quills, and the cane fife, while also penning songs. Hemphill and his string band, composed of Alex "Turpentine" Askew (guitar), Lucious Smith (banjo), and Will Head (fiddle), played a combination of blues, popular music, and spirituals for both black and white audiences mainly in Northern Mississippi. The same group also identified as a fife and drums band, with music infused in European military drum tradition and African polyrhythms, talking drum influences. According to blues writer Edward Komara, Hemphill's quill playing was highly syncopated and offered the closest connection to traditional African music.

Field collector and ethnomusicologist Alan Lomax traveled to Senatobia to seek out Hemphill after a local string bandleader described him as the "boar-hog musician of the hills”, also proclaiming him as "the best musician in the world". On August 15, 1942, Lomax recorded 22 songs and an interview with Hemphill and his group. Although the group identified as a string band, for the recordings they played fife and drums. Lomax recorded a second session with Hemphill when he revisited him in 1959. Music critic Amanda Petrusich noted in a review for Pitchfork that "Hemphill's work incorporates attributes of the Mississippi Hill Country’s better-known traditions (the droning guitar blues mastered by McDowell, R.L. Burnside, and Junior Kimbrough, and the fife-and-drum music practiced by Otha Turner, Napolian Strickland, and Hemphill himself)", which differs from the neighboring Delta blues. His best-known song "The Eighth of January" became the basis for Johnny Horton's hit "The Battle of New Orleans".

Hemphill died in 1963, having never commercially recorded any of his songs for release in his lifetime. Nonetheless, his two field sessions with Lomax were made more accessible by the release of the compilation album The Devil's Dream in 2013. Other members of the Hemphill family also became musicians, including his daughter Rosa Lee Hill, and his paternal granddaughter, Jessie Mae Hemphill, a pioneering guitarist.

Hemphill was honored with a marker on the Mississippi Blues Trail in Senatobia.

References

American blues musicians
1876 births
1963 deaths
People from Panola County, Mississippi
Blues musicians from Mississippi
Mississippi Blues Trail
Delta blues musicians